The United States District Court for the District of Columbia (in case citations, D.D.C.) is a federal district court in the District of Columbia. It also occasionally handles (jointly with the United States District Court for the District of Hawaii and the High Court of American Samoa) federal issues that arise in the territory of American Samoa, which has no local federal court or territorial court. Appeals from the District are taken to the United States Court of Appeals for the District of Columbia Circuit (except for patent claims, and claims against the U.S. government under the Tucker Act, which are appealed to the Federal Circuit).

 the United States Attorney for the District of Columbia for the United States District Court for the District of Columbia is Matthew M. Graves.

History 

The court was established by Congress in 1863 as the Supreme Court of the District of Columbia, replacing the abolished circuit and district courts of the District of Columbia that had been in place since 1801. The court consisted of four justices, including a chief justice, and was granted the same powers and jurisdiction as the earlier circuit court. Any of the justices could convene a United States circuit court or a local criminal court. In 1936, Congress renamed the court the District Court of the United States for the District of Columbia. Its current name was adopted in 1948, and from then on justices were known as judges.

Originally housed in the former District of Columbia City Hall, the court now sits in the E. Barrett Prettyman Federal Courthouse located at 333 Constitution Avenue, Northwest, Washington, D.C. The District has no local district attorney or equivalent, and so local prosecutorial matters also fall into the jurisdiction of the United States Attorney for the District of Columbia. Assistant United States Attorneys (AUSAs) are tasked with prosecution of not only federal crimes but also crimes that would normally be left to the state prosecutor's discretion. Because of this the District has the largest U.S. Attorney's Office in the nation, with around 250 AUSAs.

Current judges 
:

Vacancies and pending nominations

Former judges

Chief judges

Succession of seats 
 Associate Justices Clabaugh, McCoy, Wheat and Laws were elevated to Chief Justice.
 Chief Justice Laws was assigned to the new Seat 13 by operation of law upon the abolition of the Chief Justice Seat 1.

See also 
 Courts of the United States
 List of current United States district judges
 List of United States federal courthouses in the District of Columbia

References

External links 
 U.S. District Court for the District of Columbia Official Website
 Official Courthouse History
 Federal Judicial Center's History of the Court

District of Columbia
Government in Washington, D.C.
1863 establishments in Washington, D.C.
Courts and tribunals established in 1863